Brendan Colin Charles Hill (born 27 March 1970 in London, England) is an English-born American musician, best known as the drummer (and one of the co-founders) of the jam band Blues Traveler.

History
Hill is one of the original members of Blues Traveler. In 1983, while attending Princeton High School in Princeton, New Jersey, Hill met harmonica player John Popper, and they formed a group dubbed Blues Band. They played mostly at parties and saw numerous bassists and guitarists come and go.  In 1987, with the addition of Chan Kinchla on guitar and Bobby Sheehan on bass, they renamed themselves "Blues Traveler".

After graduating from Princeton High School, Brendan (along with John and Bobby) enrolled in The New School for Social Research to study music.

Hill currently lives on Bainbridge Island, Washington, and owns a retail marijuana store on the island named Paper and Leaf.

Hill uses Pearl drums and Zildjian cymbals.

Side project
In his spare time, Brendan is also a drummer for the band Stolen Ogre. Brendan was involved in the formation of this band with H.O.R.D.E. buddy Michael McMorrow and still plays with them as his schedule permits, but Ogre does have a permanent drummer and tours without Hill.

References

External links
Brendan Hill's bio - BluesTraveler.com

1970 births
Living people
Blues Traveler members
English rock drummers
Grammy Award winners
People from Princeton, New Jersey
Princeton High School (New Jersey) alumni
Musicians from New Jersey
21st-century drummers